The 1943 All-Ireland Senior Hurling Championship was the 57th staging of the All-Ireland Senior Hurling Championship, the Gaelic Athletic Association's premier inter-county hurling tournament. The championship began non 2 May 1943 and ended on 5 September 1943.

The championship was won by Cork who secured the title following a 5-16 to 0-4 defeat of Antrim in the All-Ireland final. This was their 14th All-Ireland title.

Cork were also the defending champions and retained the title for the second successive year to become the fourth team to win the three in-a-row.

Teams

Overview

Eight teams contested the Leinster championship, with Meath and Wicklow returning after absences. Six teams contested the Munster championship, with Kerry fielding a team for the first time after a long absence from the senior ranks. Galway, who faced no competition in their own province, entered the championship at the All-Ireland semi-final stage. The Ulster champions were permitted to enter the All-Ireland series for the first time.

Team summaries

Results

Leinster Senior Hurling Championship

Munster Senior Hurling Championship

First round

Semi-finals

Final

Ulster Senior Hurling Championship

All-Ireland Senior Hurling Championship

Championship statistics

Scoring

Widest winning margin: 27 points 
Cork 5-16 - 0-4 Antrim  (All-Ireland final, 5 September 1943)
Most goals in a match: 13 
Antrim 7-0 - 6-2 Galway (All-Ireland quarter-final, 4 July 1943)

Sources

 Corry, Eoghan, The GAA Book of Lists (Hodder Headline Ireland, 2005).
 Donegan, Des, The Complete Handbook of Gaelic Games (DBA Publications Limited, 2005).
 Horgan, Tim, Christy Ring: Hurling's Greatest (The Collins Press, 2007).
 Nolan, Pat, Flashbacks: A Half Century of Cork Hurling (The Collins Press, 2000).
 Sweeney, Éamonn, Munster Hurling Legends (The O'Brien Press, 2002).

External links
 1943 All-Ireland Senior Hurling Championship results

References

1943